Gilley is an unincorporated community located in Letcher County, Kentucky, United States. Its post office  is closed.

References

Unincorporated communities in Letcher County, Kentucky
Unincorporated communities in Kentucky
Coal towns in Kentucky